The First Thai–Lao Friendship Bridge is a bridge over the Mekong, connecting Nong Khai Province and the city of Nong Khai in Thailand with Vientiane Prefecture in Laos; the city of Vientiane is approximately  from the bridge. With a length of 1,170 meters (0.73 mi), the bridge has two -wide road lanes, two -wide footpaths and a single  gauge  railway line in the middle, straddling the narrow central reservation.

 The rail gauge is 
 The loading gauge might be 
 The structure gauge (roughly equal to a road lane) might be about

History

Opened on 8 April 1994, it was the first bridge across the lower Mekong, and the second on the full course of the Mekong.

The cost was about A$42 million, funded by the Australian government as development aid for Laos.

The bridge was designed and built by Australian companies as a demonstration of their ability to complete major infrastructure projects in Southeast Asia. The concept design of a balanced cantilever bridge was proposed by Bruce Ramsay of VSL with the final design carried out by Maunsell consulting engineers.

The official name of the bridge was changed by the addition of "First" after the Second Thai–Lao Friendship Bridge further south at Savannakhet opened in January 2007.

Road traffic

Traffic on the bridge drives on the left, as in Thailand, while traffic in Laos drives on the right. The changeover at the Lao end, just before the border post, is controlled by traffic lights.

A shuttle bus service operates across the bridge, between the Lao and Thai border posts.

Bicycles and tricycles can travel on either the road or the footpath, while pedestrians can walk directly on the footpath.

The bridge is part of AH12 of the Asian Highway Network.

Railway

A meter gauge rail track from Nong Khai station runs along the central reservation of the bridge. Road traffic is stopped when a train is crossing.

This was the first railway link to Laos (but not the first railway, as a short portage line once existed). The Thai government agreed to finance the line through a combination of grant and loan. Construction formally began on 19 January 2007. Test trains began running on 4 July 2008. Formal inauguration occurred on 5 March 2009.

On 22 February 2006, approval of funding for the rail line from Thanaleng Railway Station to Vientiane, was announced by the French Development Agency.

A US$50 million loan was also reportedly received from the Thai government for the extension. Construction was originally slated to begin in December 2010, and Lao railway officials had confirmed as late as September 2010 that plans would go ahead. The extension, which would have taken an estimated three years to complete, would have stretched  from Thanaleng to a new main Khamsavath Station The station will be completed by June 2022 and open 2023.

Since February 2010 the Eastern and Oriental Express crosses the Mekong via the bridge into Laos. There is currently no connection to the China-Laos Railway but the standard gauge line circles the north east of Vientiane to a depot just 2 km from the Friendship Bridge. A new bridge is proposed from this point to join the proposed Thai High speed line at Nong Khai station  just south of the Mekong.

See also 
 List of crossings of the Mekong River
 Second Thai–Lao Friendship Bridge
 Third Thai–Lao Friendship Bridge
 Fourth Thai–Lao Friendship Bridge
 Fifth Thai–Lao Friendship Bridge
 Sixth Thai–Lao Friendship Bridge
 Seventh Thai–Lao Friendship Bridge
 Transport in Laos
 Transport in Thailand
 Laos–Thailand relations
 Kunming–Singapore railway

References

External links 

 Eastern and Oriental Express
 Video: journey, Nong Khai to Thanaleng
 Video: RHN Hitachi Railcars, built in 1967

Bridges over the Mekong River
International bridges
Laos–Thailand border crossings
Bridges in Thailand
Bridges in Laos
Road-rail bridges
International railway lines
Rail transport in Laos
Railway bridges in Thailand
Buildings and structures in Nong Khai province
Buildings and structures in Vientiane
Bridges completed in 1994
Greater Mekong Subregion